Selim Chazbijewicz (born 17 November 1955 in Gdańsk) is a Polish political scientist, columnist, and poet. Since 2017, he has served as an ambassador to Kazakhstan.

Life 
Selim Chazbijewicz was born in 1957 in Gdańsk to a family of Tatar descent. He spent his childhood there. In 1980, he earned his master's degree from the University of Gdańsk, Faculty of Polish Philology. In 1991, he defended at the Adam Mickiewicz University in Poznań Ph.D. thesis on Polish Muslims in 20th century. In 2002, he received his post-doctoral degree (habilitation), thesis on Crimean Tatars after World War II. He has been working as an assistant professor at the University of Warmia and Mazury in Olsztyn. He is also member of the Polish Academy of Sciences.

Apart from his academic career, he has been publishing poems and working as an editor. Between 1986 and 1991, he was editor-in-chief of Życie Muzułmańskie (Muslim Life) quarterly. In 1994 he became editor-in-chief of Rocznik Tatarów Polskich (Polish Tatars Yearly). He is a member of Polish Writers' Association.

Between 1999 and 2007, he was the president of Związek Tatarów Rzeczypospolitej Polskiej (Association of Tatars of the Republic of Poland). In 2003, he became Imam of Gdańsk Muslim Community.
 
In the 2000s, he joined the Law and Justice party since 2000s. In 2017, Chazbijewicz was nominated Poland ambassador to Kazakhstan. On 18 October 2017, he presented his credentials to the President of Kazakhstan Nursultan Nazarbayev. He is accredited also to Kyrgyzstan, presenting his credentials to the President of Kyrgyzstan Almazbek Atambayev on 27 October 2017.
 
He is the recipient of the Bronze Cross of Merit (2014).

Works 

 Scientific books

 Awdet czyli Powrót. Walka polityczna Tatarów krymskich o zachowanie tożsamości narodowej i niepodległość państwa po II wojnie światowej, Olsztyn: Wydawnictwo Uniwersytetu Warmińsko-Mazurskiego 2000, .
 Tatarzy krymscy: walka o naród i wolną ojczyznę, Poznań-Września: Likon 2001, .
 Baśnie, podania i legendy polskich Tatarów, Białystok: Muzułmański Związek Religijny w Rzeczypospolitej Polskiej. Najwyższe Kolegium 2012.
 Tatarzy pod Grunwaldem (co-author: Sławomir Moćkun), Grunwald-Stębark: Muzeum Bitwy pod Grunwaldem 2012.

 Poems

 Wejście w baśń, Olsztyn 1978.
 Czarodziejski róg chłopca, Gdańsk 1980, .
 Sen od jabłek ciężki, Łódź 1981, .
 Krym i Wilno, Gdańsk 1990.
 Mistyka tatarskich kresów, Białystok 1990.
 Poezja Wschodu i Zachodu, Warszawa 1992.
 Rubai'jjat albo czterowiersze, Gdańsk 1997, ISBN .
 Hymn do Sofii, Olsztyn 2005, .

References 

 

1955 births
Ambassadors of Poland to Kazakhstan
Recipients of the Bronze Cross of Merit (Poland)
Law and Justice politicians
Living people
Polish political scientists
Polish opinion journalists
Polish people of Lipka Tatar descent
University of Gdańsk alumni
Academic staff of the University of Warmia and Mazury in Olsztyn
Polish Muslims